Austerlitz is a 1960 French film directed by Abel Gance and starring Jean Marais, Rossano Brazzi, Martine Carol, Jack Palance, Claudia Cardinale, Vittorio De Sica, Orson Welles, Leslie Caron and Jean-Louis Trintignant. Pierre Mondy portrays Napoleon in this film about his victory at the Battle of Austerlitz. Leslie Caron plays the role of his mistress Élisabeth Le Michaud d'Arçon.

Synopsis
The first half of this film covers Napoleon's coronation as Emperor and political manoeuvrings while the second half covers the actual battle, where he beat both Austrian and Russian forces in his drive eastward.

Cast

Noteworthy
Composer Jean Ledrut claimed that "La Marche d'Austerlitz" from his score had been plagiarised by producer/composer Joe Meek in the 1962 pop hit "Telstar". The case was eventually dismissed,  but the lawsuit prevented Meek from receiving royalties from the record during his lifetime, and the issue was not resolved in Meek's favour until three weeks after his suicide in 1967. Austerlitz was not released in the UK until 1965, and Meek was unaware of the film when the lawsuit was filed in March 1963.

Versions
The original French version runs longer than the English dubbed international version. The French version contains extra scenes including ones with Napoleon visiting his mistress and of Jean Louis Trintignant imagining the coronation for the palace staff.

DVD
A French DVD was released including interviews with star Pierre Mondy and other participants.

References

External links

1960 films
1960 war films
1960s historical films
Films directed by Abel Gance
Films set in the Czech Republic
Films set in Austria
Films set in 1804
Films set in 1805
Italian historical drama films
Yugoslav historical drama films
French epic films
French historical drama films
French war drama films
Depictions of Napoleon on film
Cultural depictions of Joséphine de Beauharnais
Cultural depictions of Horatio Nelson
Cultural depictions of Charles Maurice de Talleyrand-Périgord
Napoleonic Wars films
War epic films
Battle of Austerlitz
1960s French-language films
1960s Italian films
1960s French films